The Kensington Oval is a stadium located to the west of the capital city Bridgetown on the island of Barbados. It is the pre-eminent sporting facility on the island and is primarily used for cricket. it has hosted many important and exciting cricket games between local, regional, and international teams during its more than 120-year history.

History
Cricket at the Oval began in 1882 when the Pickwick Cricket Club assumed formal ownership of the ground.
The first international match held was in 1895 when Slade Lucas' side visited the island.  The first Test match was held in January 1930, when the West Indies and England played to a draw.  Since the genesis there have been a total of 43 Test matches played on the Kensington Oval grounds, 21 of those matches won by the West Indian cricket team.  The new stadium has been commemorated through two 2007 Barbadian postage stamps.

Redevelopment

Structures and facilities
The stands of the Kensington Oval were extensively rebuilt for the 2007 Cricket World Cup in a BDS$90M (US$45 Million) redevelopment. Demolition of the old stadium began on schedule in June 2006 after completion of the first Test against Pakistan. Innotech Construction Inc. reconstructed the new Kensington Oval in late September into early October 2006 and the team from the Barbados Light & Power Company cut down and removed some of the old utility poles at the traffic lights at the Holborn Circle, the entrances and exits 
of Fontabelle Road, Spring Garden Highway, Prescod Boulevard and Harbour Road and they planted new utility poles with electrical transmitters attached on to them. They also dug up, resurfaced and repaved Prescod Boulevard and Fontabelle Road just in time for Cricket World Cup 2007 in Barbados.  The names of the former stands which made up the Kensington stadium were the George Challenor stand, the Hall and Griffith, the Kensington, the Mitchie Hewitt, the Pickwick, and the Three Ws stand plus the Peter Short Media Centre. Most of these names have been retained.

Outfield
In 2004, the STRI construction team were chosen to redevelop the Kensington Oval outfield, after they were previously involved with the Lord's Cricket Ground outfield reconstruction. 
The topsoil on the grounds previous outfield was a sandy clay loam, which struggled to cope with Bridgetown's occasional heavy rainfall, with climate data indicating that a storm lasting up to an hour could dump about 50mm of rain once every five years. The topsoil was a complete mixture of soils and significantly varied in depth, lying over ancient coral reef limestone.

The new outfield consists of; 175mm of amended root-zone, 125mm of unamended root-zone sand, a 50mm blinding layer and a 100mm gravel drainage layer. 
Although many types of grass options was suggested to be used for the outfield, it was decided to use Tifway 419 hybrid Bermuda grass as this type of grass is highly disease resistant, dense and spreads quickly to ensure quick recovery from injury and allows close mowing.
The pitch square was reconstructed with four main individual pitches and a profile consisting of; 200mm of clay, over 150mm of medium-fine sand along with a gravel drainage layer. The square's soil is made up of 71% clay, 14% silt and 14% sand and during the redevelopment it was isolated from the rest of the ground so that it could be constructed before the outfield was completed. The pitch square was sown down with Princess Bermuda grass, with the base and soil added in layers, before completion in May 2006.

Events
The Kensington Oval has also hosted many non-cricket events, such as matches of the Barbados national football team, hockey, inter-school athletics, Miss Barbados pageants, and concert events. The ground also has a jumbo TV screen and also a jacuzzi type area, for fans to watch while relaxing in the pool (similar to Chase Field in Phoenix, Arizona). Behind this is a large grassy hill for fans to have picnics on, which has a bunker underneath for the media.

On 5 August 2011 Rihanna performed at the Kensington Oval for the first time in her home country on her Loud Tour. She planned another show for 1 November 2013 as a part her Diamonds World Tour, however the concert was cancelled due to technical difficulties.

2007 Cricket World Cup Final

The expanded Kensington Oval was the venue for the 2007 Cricket World Cup final between Australia and Sri Lanka, held on 28 April, with the official attendance reaching 20,108.
This was the first World Cup final to be a repeat – the sides previously met in the 1996 World Cup final, which Sri Lanka won. Australia has won every World Cup match against Sri Lanka apart from that loss. The match was Sri Lanka's second World Cup final appearance and Australia's sixth, their fourth in a row.

Ricky Ponting won the toss and elected to bat. However, the start of play was delayed due to rain, and the match was reduced to 38 overs per side. Adam Gilchrist played an incredible innings of 149 – the highest for any batsman in a World Cup final – to give Australia an imposing total going in at to break. While Sri Lankan batsmen Kumar Sangakkara and Sanath Jayasuriya were adding 116 for the second wicket, the contest was alive, but after the pair got out, Sri Lanka's chances slowly washed way. Further rain forced the reduction of Sri Lanka's innings to just 36 overs, with the target revised to 269.  At the culmination of the 33rd over, with Sri Lanka still trailing the adjusted Duckworth-Lewis target by 37 runs, the umpires suspended the game due to bad light.  While Australia's players began to celebrate their victory (since the minimum 20 overs had been reached), the umpires incorrectly announced that because the match was suspended due to light and not rain, the final three overs would have to be bowled the following day. With Sri Lanka needing 61 runs from 18 deliveries, Mahela Jayawardene agreed there was no need to return the following day, and instructed his team to resume batting, with Ricky Ponting agreeing to play only spinners. Umpires later apologized for their error, and that the match should have ended then with Australia winning by 37 runs. The last three overs were played in almost complete darkness, during which Sri Lanka added nine runs, giving Australia a 53-run victory via the DL method, as Sri Lanka had batted 2 overs fewer than Australia.

2010 ICC World Twenty20 Final
The Final was held in Barbados on 16 May 2010. The match was won by Collingwood's England, delivering the team its first ever victory in a worldwide limited overs tournament, and its first International Cricket Council trophy. Australia batted first and scored 147 runs for the loss of six wickets. England bettered Australia's total with 18 balls to spare. Craig Kieswetter was England's top scorer with 63 runs from 49 balls while Kevin Pietersen scored 47 from 31. David Hussey of Australia scored 59. Pietersen was subsequently named Man of the Tournament having scored 248 runs, while Kieswetter was Man of the Match.

Awards
In 2008 the Institution of Structural Engineers recognised the Kensington Oval as one of its Structural Awards winners; this was under the section of "Awards for Sports or Leisure Structures". In summing up the stadium the ISE stated: "…This inspiring structure, created with meticulous attention to buildability, has added an outstanding addition to the Barbados skyline. It is already immensely popular with the most enthusiastic cricket audience in the world…"

Gallery

New stadium

Pre-2007 stadium 
These are historic stands as they looked in 2000. These former stands were demolished to make way for the new stadium.

See also
List of Test cricket grounds
List of international cricket centuries at the Kensington Oval
List of international five-wicket hauls at Kensington Oval

Notes

References

External links
 
 Kensington Oval profile information – Barbados Tourism Investment Inc.
 Kensington Oval, TripAdvisor.com
 Photo of the new Kensington Oval
 Kensington Oval profile

Cricket grounds in Barbados
Saint Michael, Barbados
Test cricket grounds in the West Indies
Football venues in Barbados
2007 Cricket World Cup stadiums
Barbados